Lee Passarella is a writer and senior literary editor of the Atlanta Review.  His long narrative poem Swallowed Up In Victory (Burd Street Press, 2002) is based on the American Civil War.

Works
 Swallowed Up in Victory: A Civil War Narrative, Petersburg, 1864-1865. Burd Street Pr (2002). .
 The Geometry of Loneliness, WordTech Communications (2006). .

References

External links
http://www.leepassarella.net

American male poets
Living people
Year of birth missing (living people)
American literary editors